Oliver Krischer (born 26 July 1969) is a German politician of the Alliance '90/The Greens who has been serving as State Minister for Environment, Nature Protection, and Transport in the government of Minister-President of North Rhine-Westphalia Hendrik Wüst since 2022.

From 2021 to 2022, Krischer briefly served as Parliamentary State Secretary in the Federal Ministry for Economic Affairs and Climate Action in the coalition government of Chancellor Olaf Scholz since 2021. He was a member of the Bundestag from 2009 to 2022.

Education and early career
Krischer was born in Zülpich, West Germany. He grew up in Heimbach (Eifel; Germany). After the A-Levels and civilian service he studied biology at RWTH Aachen. From 1997 to 2002 he worked for Michaele Hustedt, a former member of the German Bundestag. From 2002 to 2009 he worked as scientific assistant for the Green parliamentary group in North Rhine-Westphalia in the thematic fields of energy, agriculture and land use regulation.

Political career
In 1989, Krischer joined the Green Party. Since 1994 he is member of the Kreistag and became chairman of the parliamentary group in 1997. He became district chairman of his party in 2005 and was elected in the Bezirksvorstand Mittelrhein in 2006. From 2001 to 2006 he served as chairman of the Biological Station in Düren.

Member of the German Bundestag, 2009–2022
In the 2009 federal elections, Krischer was elected into the German Bundestag via his nomination on the Green ballot list.

In his first term between 2009 and 2013, Krischer was a member of the Committee on Economic Affairs and Technology and an alternate member of the Committee on the Environment, Conservation and Reactor Safety. He also served as his parliamentary group's spokesperson on energy and resource efficiency. In addition, he chaired its working group on energy and climate.

From 2013 until 2021, Krischer served as vice chairman of the Green Party's parliamentary group under the leadership of co-chairs Katrin Göring-Eckardt and Anton Hofreiter; in this role, he was responsible for the topics, energy, environment, climate, reactor safety, animal protection, agriculture and transportation. He was a deputy member of the Committee on Economic Affairs and Energy and the Committee on Transport and Digital Infrastructure. Besides this he was the vice-chairman of the parliamentary inquiry into the Volkswagen emissions scandal (Dieselgate).

In the 2021 German federal election, he was elected to a direct mandate in Aachen I.

In the negotiations to form a so-called traffic light coalition of the Social Democrats (SPD), the Green Party and the FDP following the 2021 federal elections, Krischer led his party's delegation in the working group on environmental policy; his co-chairs from the other parties are Matthias Miersch and Lukas Köhler.

In the negotiations to form a coalition government under the leadership of Minister-President of North Rhine-Westphalia Hendrik Wüst following the 2022 state elections, Krischer was part of his party’s delegation.<ref>Martin Teigeler (23 May 2022), Nach NRW-Wahl: Sondierungen beginnen am Dienstag Westdeutscher Rundfunk’'.</ref>

Other activities
Regulatory agencies
 Federal Network Agency for Electricity, Gas, Telecommunications, Post and Railway (BNetzA), Member of the Advisory Board

Corporate boards
 NRW.BANK, Ex-Officio Member of the Supervisory Board (since 2022)
 AWA Entsorgung GmbH, Member of the Supervisory Board

Non-profit organizations
 Bundesverband Bioenergie (BBE), Member of the Advisory Board
 German Renewable Energy Federation (BEE), Member of the Parliamentary Advisory Board
 Heinrich Böll Foundation, Member of the Supervisory Board
 Friends of the Eifel National Park, Chairman of the Board
 Friends of the Earth Germany (BUND), Member
 Nature And Biodiversity Conservation Union (NABU), Member
 Society for the prevention of cruelty to animals (Tierschutzverein'') in the administrative district Düren, Member
 German Energy Agency (DENA), Ex-Officio Chairman of the Supervisory Board (2021–2022)
 Agora Energiewende, Member of the Council (–2021)
 German Industry Initiative for Energy Efficiency (DENEFF), Member of the Parliamentary Advisory Board (–2021)
 Eurosolar, Member of the Board (2011–2013)

Personal life
Krischer currently lives in Düren with his wife and their two sons.

References

External links
 Krischer on www.bundestag.de 
 Krischer‘s Homepage 

Living people
1969 births
People from Düren
Members of the Bundestag for North Rhine-Westphalia
Members of the Bundestag 2021–2025
Members of the Bundestag 2017–2021
Members of the Bundestag 2013–2017
Members of the Bundestag 2009–2013
Members of the Bundestag for Alliance 90/The Greens